For Tomorrow may refer to:
 For Tomorrow (song)
 For Tomorrow (comics)